The Third Dahal cabinet is the current Government of Nepal, formed on 26 December 2022 after Pushpa Kamal Dahal was appointed as the new Prime Minister of Nepal by president Bidya Devi Bhandari, following the 2022 Nepalese general election.

History 
Dahal's claim for prime minister was supported by the Communist Party of Nepal (Unified Marxist–Leninist), Rastriya Swatantra Party, Rastriya Prajatantra Party, People's Socialist Party, Nepal, Janamat Party and Nagarik Unmukti Party, alongside his own Communist Party of Nepal (Maoist Centre). Prime Minister Dahal took his oath of office alongside three deputy prime ministers and four ministers on 26 December 2022.

On 10 January 2023, Dahal won a motion of confidence with 268 out of 270 votes in the 275-member House of Representatives, where he was supported by the ruling coalition as well as the opposition Nepali Congress, Communist Party of Nepal (Unified Socialist) and the Loktantrik Samajwadi Party, Nepal.

The cabinet was then expanded to include one more deputy prime minister, 11 ministers and three state ministers on 17 January 2023.

Deputy prime minister and minister for Home Affairs, Rabi Lamichhane, was stripped from his position in the cabinet on 27 January 2023 after the Supreme Court ruled that Lamichhane did not follow due process to re-obtain his Nepali citizenship after renouncing his American citizenship, and thus, he was not a legal Nepali citizen. Remaining ministers of the RSP resigned on 5 February after the party decided to call back its members from the cabinet while maintaining its support to the government.

On 25 February 2023, all ministers from the RPP resigned from the government, with the party also withdrawing its support, after a new coalition of eight parties including Nepali Congress, CPN (Maoist Centre), PSPN, CPN (US), Janamat Party, LSPN, NUP and Rastriya Janamorcha was formed with an agreement to support Nepali Congress' candidate in the upcoming presidential election. Shortly after, on 27 February, the CPN (UML) decided to quit government and withdraw its support as well, and its ministers resigned en-masse the same day.

Prime Minister Dahal now has to seek a confidence vote in the parliament by 28 March, and is expected to include members from the new coalition into the cabinet soon.

Current arrangement

Former arrangements

Till 27 February 2023

Till 25 February 2023

Till 5 February 2023

Till 27 January 2023

References 

Cabinet of Nepal
2022 establishments in Nepal
Cabinets established in 2022
Dahal